Porn 2.0, named after "Web 2.0", refers to pornographic websites featuring user-generated content, including social networking features such as user-based categorizing, webcam hosting, blogs and comments. This is in contrast to the static content offered by "Web 1.0" porn sites. Porn 2.0 sites may offer features similar to mainstream Web 2.0 services such as video communities (Metacafe, Vimeo, YouTube) and social sites (Tumblr, Twitter), general blogging, (Blogger, DailyBooth, Lookbook.nu) and photo hosting (Flickr, Photobucket, Picasa).

Since their inception, Porn 2.0 Web sites have gathered great popularity, but have meanwhile encountered various legal and other difficulties. Among these difficulties are concerns about the digital content copyright, trade media and affiliating partnership advertising. Other concerns include the idea of sharing versus privacy and the legal ramifications of large quantities of free, user-generated pornographic content on the Internet.

Monetization

Unlike Web 2.0 ventures such as Facebook, Myspace or YouTube, Porn 2.0 has yet to find a strategy that proves to be commercially profitable. High server costs from hosting the large amount of user-generated content paired with little to no user-generated income puts Porn 2.0 websites in a challenging financial position. Because Porn 2.0 services have, so far, been free of charge to users, the only source of revenue for these sites is from advertising placement.

Controversies

Copyright issues
Copyright infringement is among the challenges that have confronted Porn 2.0. Porn 2.0 websites have come under attack as being potentially harmful to the economics of more traditional pornography outlets such as DVD sales and monthly paid subscription adult sites.

Privacy
It is possible that users upload material without the models' consent. This is usually prohibited by the sites' Terms of Use, although some sites such as Voyeurweb allow non-consensual photos and move offices frequently to avoid the legal issues this might otherwise entail. Photos and videos of non-consenting models are often obtained through the use of hidden cameras and the sexualization of their nudity. A woman going nude for a shower at her gym, for example, may be filmed without her knowledge and have the video distributed as porn.

Porn 3.0
For Porn 3.0, news media often suggest the usage of 3D stereoscopy, multi-angle DVD, neural impulse actuators, and peripheral controller and devices similar to game controller vibration or Teledildonics, eliminating less probable technologies such as holograms.

Notes

Erotica and pornography websites
Video hosting
Web 2.0